Richard von Carlowitz (1817-1886) was a German merchant active in Canton in the 1840s. He was consul for Prussia & Saxony from 1847 to 1869, and for the North German Federation from 1869.

References

External links 

1817 births
1886 deaths
German merchants
19th-century German businesspeople